Billboard Top Country & Western Records of 1957 is made up of two year-end charts compiled by Billboard magazine ranking the year's top country and western records based on record sales and jockey plays.

Ferlin Husky had the number one country and western record of the year with "Gone".

The Everly Brothers had two of the top ten records with "Bye Bye Love" (No. 3) and "Wake Up Little Susie" (No. 8).

Elvis Presley and Marty Robbins each had five of the Top 50 records, including No. 1 hits: "Jailhouse Rock", "Teddy Bear", "All Shook Up", "A White Sport Coat", and "Singing the Blues".

Decca Records led the other labels with 15 of the top 50 records, followed by RCA Victor with 13, Columbia Records with 11, Capitol Records with seven, and Sun Records with six.

See also
List of Billboard number-one country songs of 1957
Billboard year-end top 50 singles of 1957
1957 in country music

Notes

References

1957 record charts
Billboard charts
1957 in American music